Vukosavlje is a municipality located in Republika Srpska, an entity of Bosnia and Herzegovina. It is situated in the southern part of the Posavina region. As of 2013, it has a population of 4,667 inhabitants.

The small municipality was created from part of the pre-war municipality of Odžak (the other part of the pre-war municipality is now in the Federation of Bosnia and Herzegovina entity) (settlements: Gnionica, Jošava, Srnava and parts of Ade and Potočana) and some villages from Modriča (Jakeš, Pećnik and Modrički Lug).

Geography
It is located between municipalities of Odžak to the north, Šamac to the east, Modriča to the south, and Brod to the west.

Demographics

Population

Ethnic composition

2013

In the 2013 census, the municipality of Vukosavlje had 4,667 residents, including:

2,180 (46.71%) Bosniaks
1,516 (32.48%) Serbs
776 (16.62%) Croats
195 (4.17%) others

See also
Municipalities of Republika Srpska

References

External links

Municipalities of Republika Srpska
Populated places in Vukosavlje
Cities and towns in Republika Srpska
Vukosavlje